Cristiano Piccini (born 26 September 1992) is an Italian professional footballer who plays as a right back for 2. Bundesliga club 1. FC Magdeburg. He made three appearances for the Italy national team.

Club career

Fiorentina
Born in Florence, Piccini joined Fiorentina's youth setup in 2002, aged ten, after starting it out at Sporting Arno. On 5 December 2010, he made his first team – and Serie A – debut, coming on as a substitute for Manuel Pasqual in a 1–0 home win against Cagliari.

On 30 August 2011, Piccini was loaned to third division club Carrarese, in a season-long deal. He scored his first professional goal on 4 April of the following year, netting the first in a 3–1 home loss against Virtus Lanciano.

The following season, Piccini joined Spezia of Serie B on loan until the end of the season. After being an undisputed starter, he was loaned to the top level's Livorno, with a buyout clause.

Betis

On 27 August 2014, Piccini moved to Spanish Segunda División side Real Betis. He made his debut on 7  September, starting in a 4–1 away loss against SD Ponferradina in which he played a part in Jorge Molina's goal, and made 11 more appearances as they won the title.

Piccini signed a permanent four-year deal with the Verdiblancos on 9 July 2015, with Fiorentina holding a buyback option. He made his La Liga debut on 23 August, starting in a 1–1 home draw against Villarreal CF.

On 8 January 2017, Piccini scored his first top-flight goal to conclude a 2–0 win over CD Leganés at the Estadio Benito Villamarín, and followed it two months later to open a 1–1 draw at Deportivo de La Coruña. He was also sent off twice over the course of the season, the first coming after 16 minutes of a 3–1 loss at SD Eibar for a foul on Takashi Inui.

Sporting CP
On 18 May 2017, Piccini signed a five-year contract with Sporting CP. He made his debut for the club on 6 August, as the Primeira Liga season began with a 2–0 away win against C.D. Aves.

Piccini played four games as Sporting won the Taça da Liga. This included the final on 27 January 2018, in which he played all 120 minutes of a 1–1 draw before defeating Vitória F.C. on penalties. On 31 March, he was sent off in a 1–0 loss away to S.C. Braga.

Valencia
On 23 July 2018, Piccini returned to La Liga, signing for Valencia for a fee of around €10 million. In his debut season, he made 37 appearances, mostly as a starter, and scored a last-minute winner in a 2–1 home win over SD Huesca on 23 December. Seven of these games were in the victorious Copa del Rey run, including 18 minutes as a substitute for Kévin Gameiro in the 2–1 final win over FC Barcelona on 25 May 2019; the result was Valencia's first honour since 2008.

In August 2019, just two games into the new season, Piccini suffered a fractured kneecap while in training, an injury that would leave him out of the squad until the end of year. He remained sidelined for the whole season, undergoing another operation in May 2020.

Loan to Atalanta
On 9 September 2020, Piccini joined Italian Serie A club Atalanta on loan with an option to buy. The recovery from his kneecap injury delayed his debut until 21 November, when he played in a 0–0 away draw to Spezia. This turned out to be his only appearance for the Bergamo side, as Valencia reached an agreement for his early return in January 2021.

Red Star Belgrade
On 15 January 2022, Piccini was released from Valencia and signed a two-and-a-half-year contract with Serbian club Crvena Zvezda.

1. FC Magdeburg
In September 2022 Piccini joined German club 1. FC Magdeburg of the 2. Bundesliga as a free agent.

International career
Piccini was given his first senior call-up for Italy in October 2018 by manager Roberto Mancini, following injuries to several players in the team. He made his senior debut for the national team on 10 October, coming on as an 84th-minute substitute for Alessandro Florenzi in a 1–1 friendly draw against Ukraine in Genoa.

Career statistics

Club

International

Honours
Sporting CP
 Taça da Liga: 2017–18

Valencia
 Copa del Rey: 2018–19

Red Star Belgrade
 Serbian SuperLiga: 2021–22
 Serbian Cup: 2021–22

References

External links

FIGC Profile in FIGC.it 

1992 births
Living people
Footballers from Florence
Italian footballers
Association football defenders
Italy international footballers
Italy under-21 international footballers
Italy youth international footballers
Serie A players
Serie B players
La Liga players
Segunda División players
Primeira Liga players
Serbian SuperLiga players
ACF Fiorentina players
Spezia Calcio players
U.S. Livorno 1915 players
Valencia CF players
Atalanta B.C. players
Real Betis players
Sporting CP footballers
Red Star Belgrade footballers
1. FC Magdeburg players
Italian expatriate footballers
Italian expatriate sportspeople in Spain
Expatriate footballers in Spain
Italian expatriate sportspeople in Portugal
Expatriate footballers in Portugal
Italian expatriate sportspeople in Serbia
Expatriate footballers in Serbia
Italian expatriate sportspeople in Germany
Expatriate footballers in Germany